Pierre Fatio (7 November 1662 – 6 September 1707) was a lawyer and politician in the Republic of Geneva.  His struggle against the dominance of the aristocracy in the Genevan government led to his execution on charges of conspiring against the State.

Family and education 
He was born in Geneva into a patrician family.  His father was François Fatio.  His mother, Elisabeth, was the daughter of Léonard Chouet, councillor and general treasurer of the Republic of Geneva.  Pierre Fatio was a cousin and contemporary of mathematician and inventor Nicolas Fatio de Duillier.

Pierre matriculated at the University of Basel in 1679 and again in 1685.  He received a doctorate in law in 1686.  He also studied at the universities of Geneva, Valence, Montpellier and Leiden.  Back in Geneva, he established a successful law practice.

Political career 
Elected to the Council of Two Hundred in 1688, he held several positions in government: lord of Saint-Victor and chapter in 1691, auditor in 1696 and lord of Peney in 1700. In 1705, his application for the Little Council was rejected in favor of his brother, Jacques-Francois, who did not have his experience in public affairs.  This reflected the ruling Genevan aristocracy's distrust of Pierre Fatio's independent and non-conformist spirit.

Activism and execution 

Though nominally a representative democracy ruled by an elected parliament, the Council of the Two Hundred (the "General Council"), political power in Geneva resided in practice in the Council of Twenty-Five (the "Little Council"), which chose its own members and was controlled by the patrician families.  After his rejection by the Little Council, Fatio became a spokesman for the Genevan bourgeoisie in its struggle against the dominance of the patricians.  Fatio declared that the political reality in the Republic of Geneva made a mockery of the notion that the democratically elected General Council was sovereign, since "a sovereign that never performs an act of sovereignty is an imaginary being".

During the political troubles of 1707, Fatio proposed several democratizing reforms, including requiring that the General Council meet annually.  However, this was rejected by the dominant faction of his own party, which regarded Fatio's positions as too extreme.

Alleging his participation in a conspiracy to overthrow the government, the Little Council condemned Fatio to death.  He was shot in the courtyard of the prison of the bishopric.

Influence 
Among Fatio's bourgeois supporters was Jean-Jacques Rousseau's grandfather, David Rousseau, who thereby lost his government employment.  Fatio has been described by some historians as the "Swiss Gracchus".  A commemorative plaque declaring him a "defender of citizens' rights" now marks the entrance to the Rue Jean Calvin, in the historical center of Geneva.

See also 
 History of Geneva

References

External links 

 "1707: Pierre Fatio, Genevan Gracchus", from ExecutedToday.com

Executed people from the Republic of Geneva
17th-century politicians from the Republic of Geneva
1662 births
1707 deaths
University of Basel alumni
Executed politicians
18th-century politicians from the Republic of Geneva